Guillaume Schiffman is a French cinematographer who is known for the films he has made with director Michel Hazanavicius, including OSS 117: Cairo, Nest of Spies in 2006 and OSS 117: Lost in Rio in 2009. Schiffman is particularly known for his work on The Artist with Hazanavicius. Schiffman shot The Artist in color and then monochromed it into black-and-white in the lab.

On 24 January 2012, Schiffman received his first ever Academy Award nomination for his work on the silent film, The Artist. Schiffman won the BAFTA Award for Best Cinematography in 2012 for The Artist. He was invited to join the Academy of Motion Picture Arts and Sciences in June 2012 along with 175 other individuals.

Guillaume Schiffman is the son of the late French screenwriter and film director, Suzanne Schiffman. His father was American.

Filmography

References

External links
 

Living people
Best Cinematography BAFTA Award winners
César Award winners
French cinematographers
French people of American descent
Place of birth missing (living people)
Year of birth missing (living people)